Andrea Valentini may refer to:

 Andrea Valentini (designer) (born 1961), American designer
 Andrea Valentini (pentathlete) (born 1977), Italian modern pentathlete